Elbert Alonzo Root (July 20, 1915 – July 15, 1983) was an American diver who competed in the 1936 Summer Olympics. In 1936 he won the silver medal in the 10 metre platform event.

References

1915 births
1983 deaths
Divers at the 1936 Summer Olympics
Olympic silver medalists for the United States in diving
American male divers
Medalists at the 1936 Summer Olympics
20th-century American people